Gunfighters is a 1947 American Western film directed by George Waggner and starring Randolph Scott and Barbara Britton. Based on the novel Twin Sombreros by Zane Grey (the sequel of Knights of the Range) and with a screenplay by The Searchers author Alan Le May, the film is about a gunfighter who lays down his guns after being forced to shoot his best friend, and decides to become a cowhand on a ranch. The film was released in the United Kingdom as The Assassin.

Plot
Trying to put his life as a gunfighter behind him, Brazos Kane goes off to join old pal Bob Tyrell at the Inskip ranch. As Brazos approaches the spread, he hears a gunshot and sees two people riding off. He finds his friend shot dead.

Brazos takes the body to the Banner ranch, but the ruthless Banner has him arrested for the murder by Yount, a corrupt deputy. Brazos has the bullet that killed his friend and slips it to Jane Banner, the rancher's daughter.

Inskip frees him before Brazos can be summarily hanged. Brazos makes the mistake of trusting Bess, Jane's sister, but she is in love with ranch foreman Bard Macky, the man who killed Tyrell.

Brazos refuses to strap on his guns, but Yount and hired gun Orcutt try to ambush him or run him off. Inskip is murdered in cold blood and so is young cowhand Johnny O'Neil, which is the last straw for Brazos. He arms himself and goes after the bad guys, wounding Yount several times to make him talk, then calling out Orcutt and Bard for a final showdown, with Jane's help.

Cast
 Randolph Scott as Brazos Kane
 Barbara Britton as Bess Banner
 Bruce Cabot as Bard Macky
 Charley Grapewin as Rancher Inskip
 Steven Geray as Jose aka Uncle Joe
 Forrest Tucker as Hen Orcutt
 Charles Kemper as Sheriff Kiscaden
 Grant Withers as Deputy Bill Yount
 John Miles as Johnny O'Neil
 Griff Barnett as Mr. Banner
 Dorothy Hart as Jane Banner

Production
Gunfighters was filmed on location at Andy Jauregui Ranch and Monogram Ranch in Newhall, California, Vasquez Rocks Natural Area Park in Agua Dulce, California, and Sedona, Arizona.

References

External links
 
 
 
 
 

1947 films
1947 Western (genre) films
1940s action films
American Western (genre) films
Cinecolor films
Columbia Pictures films
Films based on American novels
Films based on Western (genre) novels
Films directed by George Waggner
Revisionist Western (genre) films
1940s English-language films
1940s American films